E3 SUMO-protein ligase PIAS2 is an enzyme that in humans is encoded by the PIAS2 gene.

Interactions 

Protein inhibitor of activated STAT2 has been shown to interact with:
 Androgen receptor, 
 DNMT3A, 
 PARK7,  and
 UBE2I.

References

Further reading